Rowley Massif is a prominent mountain massif between the Haley and Cline Glaciers. It surmounts the north side of the head of Odom Inlet on the east coast of Palmer Land. Mapped by United States Geological Survey (USGS) in 1974. Named by Advisory Committee on Antarctic Names (US-ACAN) after geologist Peter D. Rowley of the USGS, a member of the USGS geologic and mapping party to the Lassiter Coast, 1970–71, and leader of the USGS party to the area, 1972–73.

See also 
Mount Vennum

Mountains of Palmer Land